Ordination of LGBT clergy may refer to:

Ordination of LGBT clergy in Judaism
Ordination of LGBT Christian clergy